Theodore (or Theodorus) Bibliander (1509 in Bischofszell – 26 September 1564 in Zurich) was a Swiss orientalist, publisher, Protestant reformer and linguist.  Born Theodor Buchmann (Bibliander is a Greek translation of this surname) in Bischofszell, he studied Latin under Oswald Myconius, and Greek and Hebrew under Jakob Ceporin, and attended lectures in Basel between 1525–7 given by Johannes Oecolampadius and Konrad Pelikan.  He also became familiar with the Arabic language and other languages from the East; he became a professor of theology.  He published a Hebrew grammar in 1535, and commentaries on the Bible.  Johannes Oporinus printed his edition of the Qur'an in Latin (Basel, 1543), which was based on the medieval translation of Robert of Ketton. The edition included the entire Toledan Collection, including Doctrina Machumet, a translation of the Arabic theological tract known as the Book of One Thousand Questions.  Considered the father of biblical exegesis in Switzerland, Bibliander became involved in a doctrinal controversy with Pietro Martire Vermigli (Peter Martyr) over predestination; he was removed from his theological professorship at the Carolinum academy in 1560. He died of the plague.

Works
Institutionum grammaticarum de lingua Hebraea liber unus, Zurich, 1535 
De optimo genere grammaticorum Hebraicorum, Hieronymus Curio, Zurich, 1542 
Machumetis Saracenorum principis eiusque successorum vitae ac doctrina ipseque Alcoran, Johannes Oporin, Basel, 1543, 1550. (Qur'an: on-line text with critical apparatus in French,  on-line text with critical apparatus in German)
Relatio fidelis, Johannes Oporin, Basel, 1545
De ratione communi omnium linguarum et litterarum commentarius, Christoph Froschauer, Zurich, 1548
De ratione temporum, Johannes Oporin, Basel, 1551
Temporum a condito mundo usque ad ultimam ipsius aetatem supputatio, Johannses Oporin, Basel, 1558

See also
List of translations of the Quran

References

External links

1509 births
1564 deaths
People from Weinfelden District
Swiss Calvinist and Reformed theologians
16th-century Swiss people
16th-century deaths from plague (disease)
Translators of the Quran into Latin
Infectious disease deaths in Switzerland
16th-century Calvinist and Reformed theologians
Academic staff of Carolinum, Zurich